Anthony Crofts (c. 1593 – 1 October 1657) was an English politician who sat in the House of Commons in 1624.

Crofts was probably the son of Sir John Crofts of Little Saxham, Suffolk, and Toddington, Bedfordshire. He was admitted at Emmanuel College, Cambridge at Easter, 1611 and was admitted  at Gray's Inn on 22 May 1612. In 1624, he was elected Member of Parliament for Bury St Edmunds.
 
Crofts died at the age of 63.

References

1590s births
1657 deaths
English MPs 1624–1625
People from the Borough of St Edmundsbury
Alumni of Emmanuel College, Cambridge